Big Island Lake may refer to:

Big Island Lake (Manitoba), a lake in Canada
Big Island Lake (California), a lake in Yosemite National Park, California
Big Island Lake Wilderness, a protected area in Michigan